Allergies to cats are one of the most common allergies among human individuals. Among the eight known cat allergens, the most prominent allergen is secretoglobin Fel d 1, which is produced in the anal glands, salivary glands, and, mainly, in sebaceous glands of cats, and is ubiquitous in the United States, even in households without cats. Allergic symptoms associated with cats include coughing, wheezing, chest tightening, itching, nasal congestion, rash, watery eyes, sneezing, chapped lips, and similar symptoms. In worst-case scenarios, allergies to cats can develop into more life-threatening conditions such as rhinitis and mild to severe forms of asthma. Despite these symptoms, there are many types of solutions to mitigate the allergic effects of cats, including medications, vaccines, and home remedies. Hypoallergenic cats are another solution for individuals who want pets without the allergic consequences. Furthermore, prospective pet owners can reduce allergic reactions by selecting female cats, which are associated with a lower production of allergens.

Cat allergens 

Eight cat allergens have been recognized by the World Health Organization/International Union of Immunological Societies (WHO/IUIS) Allergen Nomenclature Sub‐Committee. Fel d 1 is the most prominent cat allergen, accounting for 96% of human cat allergies. The remaining cat allergens are Fel d 2–8, with Fel d 4, a major urinary protein found in the saliva of cats, occurring the most in humans among the other seven allergens. All cats produce Fel d 1, including hypoallergenic cats. The main method of transmission is through a cat's saliva or dander, which adheres to clothing. A study found that 63% of people allergic to cats have antibodies against Fel d 4.

Fel d 1 

Fel d 1 is the most dominant cat allergen. It is part of the secretoglobulin family, which are proteins found only in mammals and birds. Fel d 1 is primarily secreted through the sebaceous glands and can be found on the skin and fur of a cat. It is less commonly secreted through the salivary gland, lacrimal glands, and skin and anal glands.

Fel d 4 and Fel d 7 

Fel d 4 and Fel d 7 are cat lipocalins. Fel d 4 and Fel d 7 are two of the most common cat allergens after Fel d 1. Fel d 4 is produced in the submandibular salivary glands and is secreted in the saliva of cats, via which it is deposited on to cat dander during grooming, and is associated with atopic dermatitis in children with cat allergies.

Symptoms

Symptoms of an allergic reaction to cats range from mild to severe, and include swollen, red, itchy, and watery eyes, nasal congestion, itchy nose, ear pain similar to pain caused by an ear infection, sneezing, chronic sore throat or itchy throat, coughing, wheezing, asthma, hay fever, hives or rash on the face or chest, or itchy skin. If a cat has scratched, licked, or bitten someone who is allergic to cats, redness and sometimes even swelling of the affected area will occur. For those severely allergic, a reaction may resemble that of someone with a severe food allergy, and such reactions require emergency medical care.

Pathophysiology  
As the allergen enters through the nose or mouth, antigen cells analyze the allergen and present antigenic peptides to helper T cells. The helper T cells acquire a type 2 phenotype (Th2) and stimulate plasma cells to produce IgE due to the presence of specific cytokines. If Th2 is expressed too much, the symptoms of cat allergies appear. Inhaled cat allergens will activate mast cells, causing coughing, increased mucous production, and airway constriction.

Treatments

Medications
Cat allergies can often be controlled with over the counter or prescription medications. Antihistamines and decongestants may provide allergy relief.

Immunotherapy injections
Some people with allergies find relief in allergen immunotherapy, a periodic injection therapy designed to suppress the body's natural immune responses to the cat allergens. In its early stages, AIT utilized cat dander extract, which consists of microscopic dry skin flakes of cats, but later resorted to Fel d 1 due to issues of standardization. One way researchers use Fel d 1 in immunotherapy is through the alteration of its chemical structure. Disulfide bonds between Fel d 1 chains were broken to reduce the binding between the allergen and immunoglobulin E (IgE), inhibiting an allergic response.

Cat bathing
Regularly bathing a cat may remove significant amounts of allergens from fur. After bathing, the levels of Fel d 1 on cat skin and fur return within two days of bathing. In addition, amounts of Fel d 1 in the surrounding air return after a 24-hour period of bathing the cat. Feeding the cat a high quality diet with plenty of omega-3 fatty acids will help keep the coat healthy and minimize dander.

Development of other treatments

Development of several human vaccines have been abandoned, including Allervax and Cat-SPIRE. As of 2019, the Swiss company HypoPet AG is developing a vaccine it hopes could be administered to cats to reduce the emission of Fel d 1 proteins.

Hypoallergenic cats
A hypoallergenic cat is a cat that is less likely to provoke an allergic reaction in humans. Although the topic is controversial, owners' experiences and clinical studies suggest that Siberian cats, Devon Rex and Cornish Rex cats, Abyssinian cats, Balinese cats, and several other breeds, especially females, are likely to have low levels of Fel d 1, the main allergenic protein.

From among the above cats noted, the most popular cat breeds to be renowned for their hypoallergenic quality are the Siberian and Balinese. These cats produce much fewer protein allergens in comparison to regular domestic household cats or other cat breeds.  Cats that have some Balinese ancestry might produce lower amounts of protein allergens. Cat breeds that often have some Balinese lineage include the Oriental Shorthair, Oriental Longhair, and some Siamese cats.

The common theory among these two hypoallergenic medium- to long-haired cat breeds is that their long-haired gene is associated with producing reduced amounts of allergens.  This may be the case as the Balinese cat, a medium to long-haired cat breed (also referred to as the Long-haired Siamese cat) is regarded as hypoallergenic, whereas the Siamese cat, a short-haired breed, is not.  Some Siamese cats might possess hypoallergenic qualities if they have Balinese ancestry.  This might provide some evidence that the long-haired genes or traits within this cat breed have resulted in a cat that can genetically produce less amounts of the cat allergens.

In 2006, the Allerca company announced the successful breeding of a line of hypoallergenic cats. However, no peer-reviewed studies have been done to confirm their claims and many scientists and consumers are skeptical of the company's assertions. The company announced that on January 1, 2010, they will cease their breeding activities.

Another company, Felix Pets, also claims to be developing a breed of hypoallergenic cat.

Cat sex and color
Female cats produce a lower level of allergens than males, and neutered males produce a lower level of allergens than unneutered males. In 2000, researchers at the Long Island College Hospital found that cat owners with dark-colored cats were more likely to report allergy symptoms than those with light-colored cats.  A later study by the Wellington Asthma Research Group found that fur color had no effect on how much allergen a cat produced.

See also 
 List of allergies

References

External links 
 
 - Hypoallergenic Cat breed list and information
Cat Choo - News on immunisation
Coping with Allergies - Pet Allergy Information

Cats as pets
Allergology